The 1993 Oklahoma State Cowboys baseball team represented the Oklahoma State University–Stillwater in the 1993 NCAA Division I baseball season. The Cowboys played their home games at Allie P. Reynolds Stadium. The team was coached by Gary Ward in his 16th year at Oklahoma State.

The Cowboys won the Midwest Regional to advance to the College World Series, where they were defeated by the Wichita State Shockers.

Roster

Schedule

! style="" | Regular Season
|- valign="top" 

|- bgcolor="#ccffcc"
| 1 || February 21 ||  || Allie P. Reynolds Stadium • Stillwater, Oklahoma || 9–6 || 1–0 || –
|- bgcolor="#ffcccc"
| 2 || February 22 || Southern Illinois || Allie P. Reynolds Stadium • Stillwater, Oklahoma || 1–2 || 1–1 || –
|- bgcolor="#ccffcc"
| 3 || February 26 || at  || Brazell Field • Phoenix, Arizona || 5–4 || 2–1 || –
|- bgcolor="#ccffcc"
| 4 || February 27 || at Grand Caynon || Brazell Field • Phoenix, Arizona || 12–4 || 3–1 || –
|- bgcolor="#ccffcc"
| 5 || February 28 || at Grand Caynon || Brazell Field • Phoenix, Arizona || 4–3 || 4–1 || –
|-

|- bgcolor="#ccffcc"
| 6 || March 5 || vs  || Moore Family Field • Lafayette, Louisiana || 28–9 || 5–1 || –
|- bgcolor="#ccffcc"
| 7 || March 6 || at  || Moore Family Field • Lafayette, Louisiana || 10–5 || 6–1 || –
|- bgcolor="#ccffcc"
| 8 || March 7 || vs  || Moore Family Field • Lafayette, Louisiana || 4–3 || 7–1 || –
|- bgcolor="#ffcccc"
| 9 || March 9 || at  || Crutcher Scott Field • Abilene, Texas || 6–7 || 7–2 || –
|- bgcolor="#ffcccc"
| 10 || March 10 || at  || Clay Gould Ballpark • Arlington, Texas || 13–26 || 7–3 || –
|- bgcolor="#ccffcc"
| 11 || March 14 ||  || Allie P. Reynolds Stadium • Stillwater, Oklahoma || 16–7 || 8–3 || –
|- bgcolor="#ccffcc"
| 12 || March 15 || New Mexico State || Allie P. Reynolds Stadium • Stillwater, Oklahoma || 8–1 || 9–3 || –
|- bgcolor="#ccffcc"
| 13 || March 16 ||  || Allie P. Reynolds Stadium • Stillwater, Oklahoma || 13–0 || 10–3 || –
|- bgcolor="#ccffcc"
| 14 || March 17 || Texas–Arlington || Allie P. Reynolds Stadium • Stillwater, Oklahoma || 17–3 || 11–3 || –
|- bgcolor="#ccffcc"
| 15 || March 20 ||  || Allie P. Reynolds Stadium • Stillwater, Oklahoma || 10–7 || 12–3 || 1–0
|- bgcolor="#ccffcc"
| 16 || March 21 || Iowa State || Allie P. Reynolds Stadium • Stillwater, Oklahoma || 18–8 || 13–3 || 2–0
|- bgcolor="#ccffcc"
| 17 || March 23 || || Allie P. Reynolds Stadium • Stillwater, Oklahoma || 14–4 || 14–3 || 3–0
|- bgcolor="#ffcccc"
| 18 || March 24 || Kansas || Allie P. Reynolds Stadium • Stillwater, Oklahoma || 4–7 || 14–4 || 3–1
|- bgcolor="#ffcccc"
| 19 || March 26 || at Kansas || Hoglund Ballpark • Lawrence, Kansas || 8–9 || 14–5 || 3–2
|- bgcolor="#ffcccc"
| 20 || March 27 || at Kansas || Hoglund Ballpark • Lawrence, Kansas || 3–4 || 14–6 || 3–3
|- bgcolor="#ffcccc"
| 21 || March 28 || at Kansas || Hoglund Ballpark • Lawrence, Kansas || 2–9 || 14–7 || 3–4
|-

|- bgcolor="#ffcccc"
| 22 || April 2 ||  || Allie P. Reynolds Stadium • Stillwater, Oklahoma || 7–9 || 14–8 || 3–5
|- bgcolor="#ccffcc"
| 23 || April 2 || Nebraska || Allie P. Reynolds Stadium • Stillwater, Oklahoma || 13–2 || 15–8 || 4–5
|- bgcolor="#ccffcc"
| 24 || April 3 || Nebraska || Allie P. Reynolds Stadium • Stillwater, Oklahoma || 11–5 || 16–8 || 5–5
|- bgcolor="#ccffcc"
| 25 || April 6 ||  || Allie P. Reynolds Stadium • Stillwater, Oklahoma || 5–3 || 17–8 || 6–5
|- bgcolor="#ccffcc"
| 26 || April 7 || Kansas State || Allie P. Reynolds Stadium • Stillwater, Oklahoma || 14–13 || 18–8 || 7–5
|- bgcolor="#ccffcc"
| 27 || April 10 || at Iowa State || Cap Timm Field • Ames, Iowa || 5–4 || 19–8 || 8–5
|- bgcolor="#ccffcc"
| 28 || April 10 || at Iowa State || Cap Timm Field • Ames, Iowa || 9–6 || 20–8 || 9–5
|- bgcolor="#ffcccc"
| 29 || April 11 || at Iowa State || Cap Timm Field • Ames, Iowa || 5–8 || 20–9 || 9–6
|- bgcolor="#ffcccc"
| 30 || April 16 || vs  || Drillers Stadium • Tulsa, Oklahoma || 0–4 || 20–10 || 9–7
|- bgcolor="#ccffcc"
| 31 || April 17 || vs Oklahoma || All Sports Stadium • Oklahoma City, Oklahoma || 9–4 || 21–10 || 10–7
|- bgcolor="#ccffcc"
| 32 || April 18 || vs Oklahoma || All Sports Stadium • Oklahoma City, Oklahoma || 17–5 || 22–10 || 11–7
|- bgcolor="#ffcccc"
| 33 || April 19 || at  || George Cole Field • Fayetteville, Arkansas || 1–4 || 22–11 || 11–7
|- bgcolor="#ccffcc"
| 34 || April 20 || at Oklahoma || L. Dale Mitchell Baseball Park • Norman, Oklahoma || 11–9 || 23–11 || 12–7
|- bgcolor="#ccffcc"
| 35 || April 21 || Oklahoma || Allie P. Reynolds Stadium • Stillwater, Oklahoma || 12–10 || 24–11 || 13–7
|- bgcolor="#ccffcc"
| 36 || April 23 || at  || KSU Baseball Stadium • Manhattan, Kansas || 24–4 || 25–11 || 14–7
|- bgcolor="#ccffcc"
| 37 || April 24 || at Kansas State || KSU Baseball Stadium • Manhattan, Kansas || 17–8 || 26–11 || 15–7
|- bgcolor="#ccffcc"
| 38 || April 25 || at Kansas State || KSU Baseball Stadium • Manhattan, Kansas || 5–4 || 27–11 || 16–7
|- bgcolor="#ccffcc"
| 39 || April 26 || Arkansas || Allie P. Reynolds Stadium • Stillwater, Oklahoma || 4–1 || 28–11 || 16–7
|- bgcolor="#ffcccc"
| 40 || April 27 || at Wichita State || Eck Stadium • Wichita, Kansas || 7–12 || 28–12 || 16–7
|- bgcolor="#ccffcc"
| 41 || April 30 ||  || Allie P. Reynolds Stadium • Stillwater, Oklahoma || 18–0 || 29–12 || 16–7
|-

|- bgcolor="#ccffcc"
| 42 || May 1 || Texas Wesleyan || Allie P. Reynolds Stadium • Stillwater, Oklahoma || 11–2 || 30–12 || 16–7
|- bgcolor="#ccffcc"
| 43 || May 1 || Texas Wesleyan || Allie P. Reynolds Stadium • Stillwater, Oklahoma || 13–0 || 31–12 || 16–7
|- bgcolor="#ffcccc"
| 44 || May 7 ||  || Allie P. Reynolds Stadium • Stillwater, Oklahoma || 4–10 || 31–13 || 16–8
|- bgcolor="#ccffcc"
| 45 || May 13 || at  || Mahaney Diamond • Orono, Maine || 2–1 || 32–13 || 16–8
|- bgcolor="#ccffcc"
| 46 || May 14 || at Maine || Mahaney Diamond • Orono, Maine || 12–6 || 33–13 || 16–8
|- bgcolor="#ccffcc"
| 47 || May 15 || at Maine || Mahaney Diamond • Orono, Maine || 9–8 || 34–13 || 16–8
|-

|-
|-
! style="" | Postseason
|- valign="top" 

|- bgcolor="#ccffcc"
| 48 || May 20 || vs Kansas State || All Sports Stadium • Oklahoma City, Oklahoma || 8–2 || 35–13 || 16–8
|- bgcolor="#ccffcc"
| 49 || May 21 || vs Missouri || All Sports Stadium • Oklahoma City, Oklahoma || 8–4 || 36–13 || 16–8
|- bgcolor="#ffcccc"
| 50 || May 22 || vs Kansas || All Sports Stadium • Oklahoma City, Oklahoma || 8–9 || 36–14 || 16–8
|- bgcolor="#ccffcc"
| 51 || May 22 || vs Nebraska || All Sports Stadium • Oklahoma City, Oklahoma || 8–4 || 37–14 || 16–8
|- bgcolor="#ccffcc"
| 52 || May 23 || vs Kansas || All Sports Stadium • Oklahoma City, Oklahoma || 6–4 || 38–14 || 16–8
|- bgcolor="#ccffcc"
| 53 || May 23 || vs Kansas || All Sports Stadium • Oklahoma City, Oklahoma || 9–8 || 39–14 || 16–8
|-

|- bgcolor="#ccffcc"
| 54 || May 28 || Connecticut || Allie P. Reynolds Stadium • Stillwater, Oklahoma || 9–5 || 40–14 || 16–8
|- bgcolor="#ccffcc"
| 55 || May 29 ||  || Allie P. Reynolds Stadium • Stillwater, Oklahoma || 14–10 || 41–14 || 16–8
|- bgcolor="#ccffcc"
| 56 || May 30 ||  || Allie P. Reynolds Stadium • Stillwater, Oklahoma || 8–3 || 42–14 || 16–8
|- bgcolor="#ffcccc"
| 57 || May 31 ||  || Allie P. Reynolds Stadium • Stillwater, Oklahoma || 0–4 || 42–15 || 16–8
|- bgcolor="#ccffcc"
| 58 || May 31 || Arizona || Allie P. Reynolds Stadium • Stillwater, Oklahoma || 11–10 || 43–15 || 16–8
|-

|- bgcolor="#ffcccc"
| 59 || June 5 || vs Texas || Johnny Rosenblatt Stadium • Omaha, Nebraska || 5–6 || 43–16 || 16–8
|- bgcolor="#ccffcc"
| 60 || June 7 || vs Arizona State || Johnny Rosenblatt Stadium • Omaha, Nebraska || 5–4 || 44–16 || 16–8
|- bgcolor="#ccffcc"
| 61 || June 8 || vs Texas || Johnny Rosenblatt Stadium • Omaha, Nebraska || 7–6 || 45–16 || 16–8
|- bgcolor="#ffcccc"
| 62 || June 10 || vs Wichita State || Johnny Rosenblatt Stadium • Omaha, Nebraska || 4–10 || 45–17 || 16–8
|-

Awards and honors 
Jake Benz
All-Big Eight Conference

Thad Chaddrick
All-Big Eight Conference
First Team All-American National Collegiate Baseball Writers Association

Rob Gaiko
Big Eight Conference All-Tournament Team

Jason Heath
College World Series All-Tournament Team

Sean Hugo
Big Eight Conference All-Tournament Team

Roberto Lopez
Big Eight Conference All-Tournament Team

Fred Ocasio
Honorable Mention All-American National Collegiate Baseball Writers Association

Ernesto Rivera
All-Big Eight Conference
Second Team All-American American Baseball Coaches Association
First Team All-American National Collegiate Baseball Writers Association

Hunter Triplett
Big Eight Conference All-Tournament Team
College World Series All-Tournament Team

References

Oklahoma State Cowboys baseball seasons
Oklahoma State Cowboys baseball
College World Series seasons
Oklahoma State
Big Eight Conference baseball champion seasons